Jasna Gabrič (born ) was the mayor of Trbovlje, Slovenia from 2014 to 2022 and is the current first vice-president of Renew Europe in the European Committee of the Regions.

References

Further reading 

 
 

Living people
Date of birth missing (living people)
Place of birth missing (living people)
Mayors of places in Slovenia
People from Trbovlje
21st-century Slovenian women politicians
21st-century Slovenian politicians
20th-century Slovenian politicians
20th-century Slovenian women politicians
Year of birth missing (living people)
1980s births